Guillaume Marx (born 24 May 1972) is a former professional tennis player from France.

Biography
Marx had a best singles ranking of 236 in the world. He qualified for the main draw of two ATP Tour tournaments in 1993, the Italian Open (Rome Masters) and Swiss Open. As a doubles player, he played in the main draw of the French Open men's doubles events in both 1993 and 1997.

Now based in Canada, Marx is the coach of Félix Auger-Aliassime and has previously worked with Milos Raonic.

Challenger titles

Doubles: (1)

References

External links
 
 

1972 births
Living people
French male tennis players
French tennis coaches